The Musée d'Art Contemporain du Val-de-Marne, nicknamed MAC/VAL, is a museum of contemporary art located in the Place de la Libération in Vitry-sur-Seine, Val-de-Marne, a suburb of Paris, France. It is open daily except Mondays; an admission fee is charged.

The museum opened in 2005, and is dedicated to works of art from the 1950s to the present. Its building, designed by architect Jacques Ripault, encompasses a total of 13,000 m² floor space (including 2600 m² for permanent exhibitions, 1350 m² for temporary shows, 480 m² for its research center, and 700 m² for storerooms and workshops). It also contains an auditorium and cinema of 150 seats, and is set within 10,000 m² of public garden.

Today the museum contains over a thousand works of artists active in France, including Martine Aballéa, Arman, Valérie Belin, Daniel Buren, Claude Closky, Delphine Coindet, Eugène Dodeigne, Erró, Hans Hartung, Pierre Huyghe, Véronique Joumard, Valérie Jouve, Bertrand Lamarche, Julio Le Parc, Annette Messager, François Morellet, Marylène Negro, Orlan, Bruno Perramant, Dominique Petitgand, Françoise Pétrovitch, Philippe Ramette, Judit Reigl, Pierre Soulages, Jean Tinguely, and Jean-Luc Vilmouth.

See also 
 List of museums in Paris

References

Other references 
 ParisInfo description
 Paris, Petit Futé, 2007, page 132. .

External links 
 Musée d'Art Contemporain du Val-de-Marne - official site
 Val-de-Marne Marketing Media

Art museums and galleries in Île-de-France
Contemporary art galleries in France
Art museums established in 2005
Musée d'Art Contemporain du Val-de-Marne
Museums in Val-de-Marne